Marc Scott Zicree (born 1955) is an American science fiction author, television writer and screenwriter. Zicree has written for major studios and networks including Paramount, Universal, Disney, Sony/Columbia Tri-Star, MGM, New Line, CBS, NBC, ABC, Fox, WB, UPN, Showtime, PBS, Turner, USA Networks, Syfy, Discovery, Nickelodeon, the BBC, Marvel and NPR.  His credits include Star Trek: The Next Generation, Deep Space Nine, The Twilight Zone, Babylon 5, Beauty and the Beast, Forever Knight, Sliders, Friday the 13th: The Series, Liberty's Kids, Super Friends, He-Man and the Masters of the Universe, Real Ghostbusters, The Smurfs and many others, as well as pilots for CBS, NBC, ABC and Showtime.

Career
He is the author of The Twilight Zone Companion, a detailed history of Rod Serling's TV series The Twilight Zone. Several of his interviews with The Twilight Zone actors, directors and producers are available as special features on the Twilight Zone: The Complete Definitive Collection DVD box set, and are accessible as alternative audio tracks for the associated episodes. He has also contributed to the Magic Time novel trilogy, a collaborative effort between Zicree and three other science fiction writers.

Space Command
With writer Michael Reaves and director Neil Johnson, and using crowd funding for financing, Zicree is working on a series of films under the umbrella title Space Command. A Kickstarter project page, launched by Zicree in May 2012, raised funds of $75,000 (its initial goal) in three days, and went on to raise over $220,000 during the Kickstarter campaign, making it one of the most successful crowd funding campaign as of that date.

The Space Command series has gone on to feature some of science fiction's most famous stars alongside many fresh new faces, including Doug Jones, Robert Picardo, Bill Mumy, Mira Furlan, Bruce Boxleitner, Nichelle Nichols, Barbara Bain, Christina Moses, Elizabeth Chamberlain, Ethan McDowell, Bryan McClure, and with Neil deGrasse Tyson even appearing as himself.

Works

Non-fiction books
The Twilight Zone Companion (1982)
Greenlighting Yourself Living the Hollywood Dream (2022)

Novels
Magic Time series
Magic Time (with Barbara Hambly, 2002)
Magic Time: Angelfire (written by Maya Bohnhoff, based on Zicree's concept, 2003)
Magic Time: Ghostlands (with Robert Charles Wilson, 2005)

Television credits

Space Stars (1981)
Blackstar (1981)
The Incredible Hulk (1983)
He-Man and the Masters of the Universe (1983)
The Biskitts (1983)
The Smurfs (1983)
Super Friends (1984)
Mighty Orbots (1984)
The Get Along Gang (1984)
Pole Position (1984)
The Littles (1984)
The Centurions (1986)
Galaxy High (1986)
Bionic Six (1987)
Captain Power and the Soldiers of the Future (1987)
The Real Ghostbusters (1987)
Friday the 13th: The Series (1987)
Swamp Thing (1990)
James Bond Jr. (1991)
Star Trek: The Next Generation (1991)
Beyond Reality (1991)
ABC Weekend Specials (1992)
Babylon 5 (1992)
M.A.N.T.I.S. (1994)
Phantom 2040 (1994-1995)
Forever Knight (1995)
Space Precinct (1995)
TekWar (1995)
The Lazarus Man (1996)
Star Trek: Deep Space Nine (1998)
Animorphs (1998)
Sliders (1998-1999)
The Mummy (2001)
Liberty's Kids (2002)
Star Trek: New Voyages (2007)

References

External links

 – Official site of the Space Command film series.
Interview about his career with The Critical Drinker

1955 births
21st-century American novelists
21st-century American male writers
21st-century American non-fiction writers
21st-century American screenwriters
American male novelists
American science fiction writers
American television producers
American television writers
American male television writers
Living people
Date of birth missing (living people)
Place of birth missing (living people)
American male screenwriters
American male non-fiction writers